Doune Hillclimb, Carse of Cambus, near Doune in the district of Stirling, Scotland, is the home of the only round of the British Hill Climb Championship currently to be held in Scotland (Bo'ness, Fintray and the Rest And Be Thankful have featured in the past). The course has been 1476 yards (1350m) in length since 1977. However, from the first meeting in 1968 until 1973 the start line was around 33 yards (30m) further back, and from 1974 until 1976 it was located beyond what is currently the first corner.

Prior to 1968, Lothian Car Club ran rounds of the British Hill Climb Championship at the Bo'ness Hillclimb from 1948 until 1967, when a house estate was built over part of the Bo'ness track. In 1967 the hillclimb track at Doune was designed by Ray Fielding and built with the first event taking place in April 1968.

The current outright record holder is Sean Gould, who set a time of 34.67 seconds on 20 June 2021. Video of a 35.05 second run by Jos Goodyear in his GWR Raptor can be seen here: 

For many years, Doune Hillclimb hosted rounds of the Scottish Hillclimb Championship in April, June and September each year, and rounds of the British Hillclimb Championship in June and September. No meetings were held in 2020 or in April 2021 due to the global COVID-19 pandemic. The British Hillclimb Championship was scheduled to visit Doune in June 2021, but not in September of that year.

Doune Hillclimb Winners: British Hillclimb Championship 

Key: R = Course Record; FTD = Fastest Time of the Day.

See also
 Bo'ness Hill Climb
 Fintray Hillclimb
 Forrestburn Hillclimb
 Rest and Be Thankful Speed Hill Climb.

Footnotes

External links
 Lothian Car Club
 Motor Racing Programme Covers

Hillclimbs
Motorsport venues in Scotland
Kilmadock